Bristow, or Bristowe, can refer to the following.

People 
Bristow (surname)
W.S. Bristowe (1901–1979), English naturalist

Places 
In the United States
Bristow, Indiana
Bristow, Iowa
Bristow, Mississippi
Bristow, Missouri
Bristow, Nebraska
Bristow, Oklahoma
Bristow, Virginia

Companies 
Bristow Helicopters, a British helicopter airline

Fictional characters 
Bristow (cartoon), British strip cartoon character
Sydney Bristow